Jay Alan Yim (born April 24, 1958) is an American composer of Chinese descent and recipient of a 1994 Guggenheim Fellowship.

Early life and education 
Yim was born into a Chinese family in St. Louis, Missouri on April 24, 1958.  He attended the University of California, Santa Barbara College of Creative Studies and graduated with a B.A. in 1980.  He also received a M.Mus. in 1981 from the University of London and the Royal College of Music, with a Ph.D. from Harvard University earned in 1989.

Career 
During the 1995–96 concert season, he served as Composer/Fellow for the Chicago Symphony Orchestra.  His works have been performed by the National Symphony Orchestra, Radio Filharmonisch Orkest, Residentie Orchestra, Los Angeles Philharmonic, Sendai Philharmonic, Tanglewood Music Center Orchestra, London Sinfonietta, Arditti String Quartet, New Music Consort, Het Trio, and Nieuw Ensemble.

He currently serves as a professor of music at Northwestern University.  Former students include composers Marcos Balter, Kirsten Broberg, Rodrigo Cadiz, Aaron Cassidy, and Mark Engebretson.

Honors and awards 
Yim is a 1994 recipient of a Guggenheim Fellowship for music composition in the creative arts category.  He also placed third for the 1994 Kennedy Center Friedheim Award, tied with John Anthony Lennon.

Personal life 
Yim is married to artist Marlena Novak.

References

External links 
 
 Northwestern University biography

American male classical composers
American classical composers
1958 births
20th-century classical composers
21st-century classical composers
University of California, Santa Barbara alumni
Harvard Graduate School of Arts and Sciences alumni
Living people
Pupils of Louis Andriessen
21st-century American composers
20th-century American composers
20th-century American male musicians
21st-century American male musicians
American classical musicians of Chinese descent